Opasatika is a township in the Canadian province of Ontario, located in the Cochrane District on the Opasatika River, a tributary of the Missinaibi River. Its name is of First Nation origin, meaning "river lined with poplars".

The main communities in the township are Opasatika and Lowther, both located along Highway 11 between Mattice and Harty. The ghost town of Reesor Siding, site of the 1963 Reesor Siding incident, is at the western edge of the township. The former Canadian Forces Station Lowther was located in the municipality.

Demographics 

Population:
 Population in 2016: 226
 Population in 2011: 214
 Population in 2006: 280
 Population in 2001: 325
 Population in 1996: 349
 Population in 1991: 388

Mother tongue:
 English as first language: 12.5%
 French as first language: 83.9%
 English and French as first language: 0%
 Other as first language: 3.6%

See also
List of townships in Ontario
List of francophone communities in Ontario

References

External links

Municipalities in Cochrane District
Single-tier municipalities in Ontario
Township municipalities in Ontario